Of Time and the City is a 2008 British documentary collage film directed by Terence Davies. The film has Davies recalling his life growing up in Liverpool in the 1950s and 1960s, using newsreel and documentary footage supplemented by his own commentary voiceover and contemporaneous and classical music soundtracks.

The film premiered at the 2008 Cannes Film Festival where it received rave reviews. Time Out said "The one truly great movie to emerge so far (from Cannes)..... this film is as personal, as universal in its relevance, and as gloriously cinematic as anything he has done" and The Guardian called it "a British masterpiece, a brilliant assemblage of images that illuminate our past. Not only does it tug the heart-strings but it's also savagely funny." BBC TV film critic Mark Kermode nominated it as the best overall film of 2008 on his "Kermode Awards" section of The Culture Show. In 2018 Kermode placed the film at number 1 in a list of his favourite films of the ten years (2008-2018). Duane Byrge from The Hollywood Reporter lauded the film as "poetically composed" and a "masterwork".

Of Time and the City won Best Documentary in the Australian Film Critics Association awards for 2009. Following the success of the film, in 2010 the website People’s Stories: Liverpool Lives was launched with Heritage Lottery funding, created for Of Time and the City producer Sol Papadopoulos by transmedia creator Krishna Stott. For the launch the site the actors Jonathan Pryce, Alexei Sayle, and Joe McGann contributed their own memories of the city.

References within the film

Poetry and literature
 A Shropshire Lad by A. E. Housman (opening narration, with the line "the land of lost content")
 Ozymandias by Percy Bysshe Shelley
 Felician Myrbach ("If Liverpool did not exist, it would have to be invented.")
 Ulysses by James Joyce ("As you are now we once were.")
 King James Bible - Psalm 107 ("They that go down to the sea in ships..."), Psalm 137 ("By the waters of Babylon, where we sat down..."), etc.
 The Condition of the Working Class in England by Friedrich Engels ("Removed from the sight of happier classes, poverty may struggle along as it can.")
 Crossing the Bar by Alfred, Lord Tennyson ("Twilight and evening bell, And after that the dark!")
 The Untold Want by Walt Whitman ("Now voyager go forth to seek and find.")
 Willem de Kooning ("The trouble with being poor is that it takes up all your time...")
 Alexander Chekhov ("The golden moments pass and leave no trace.")
 Four Quartets by T.S. Eliot, especially "East Coker" and "Little Gidding".
 Cicero ("O tempora, O mores.")
 Poem 301 by Emily Dickinson.
 The Nymph's Reply to the Shepherd by Sir Walter Raleigh
 Hamlet by William Shakespeare ("Good night, ladies. Good night, sweet ladies...")

Music
 Franz Liszt
 The Protecting Veil by John Tavener
 Hooray for Hollywood, song from the film Hollywood Hotel
 Dirty Old Town performed by The Spinners (UK band)
 Keep The Home Fires Burning (song)
 Still I Love Him (traditional) (sung by a young girl)
 He Ain't Heavy, He's My Brother recorded by The Hollies used over images of the Korean War
 I was glad, heard during Elizabeth II's coronation ("Vivat Regina, Vivat Regina Elizabetha. Vivat! Vivat! Vivat!")
 The Folks Who Live on the Hill performed by Peggy Lee whilst showing images of the newly erected tower blocks
 The Beatles
 Hippy Hippy Shake performed by The Swinging Blue Jeans
 Elvis Presley
 Merseybeat
 Pearl Carr & Teddy Johnson
 Alma Cogan
 Lita Roza
 Dickie Valentine
 Anton Bruckner
 Gustav Mahler
 Dmitri Shostakovich
 Jean Sibelius
 Jussi Björling
 Wilhelm Furtwängler
 Aleksandr Gauk
 Otto Klemperer
 Hans Knappertsbusch
 Robert Merrill
 Gheorghe Popescu Branesti
 Charles Munch
 Anneliese Rothenberger
 Elisabeth Schwarzkopf
 Amy Shuard
 The Pearl Fishers, opera by Georges Bizet
 Victor Sylvester
 Jesus Wants Me For A Sunbeam, Christian hymn

Films
 Singin' in the Rain
 Victim
 Seven Brides for Seven Brothers
 Young at Heart
 All That Heaven Allows

Fashion
 Coco Chanel
 Elsa Schiaparelli

Landmarks
Liverpool Philharmonic Hall
 Aintree Racecourse
 Liverpool Metropolitan Cathedral of Christ the King
 St. George's Hall, Liverpool
 Sefton Park
 Liverpool Stadium
 River Mersey
 Liverpool Exchange railway station
 New Brighton Tower
 Royal Liver Building
 Cunard Building
 Port of Liverpool Building
 Burbo Bank Offshore Wind Farm

Nearby locales
 Salford, Greater Manchester
 New Brighton, Merseyside

Regular events
 Guy Fawkes Night
 The Twelfth
 May Day

Sports
 Accrington Stanley F.C.
 Sheffield F.C.
 Hamilton Academical F.C.
 Queen of the South F.C.
 Preston North End F.C.
 Blackpool F.C.
 Everton F.C.
 West Ham United F.C.
 Leicester City F.C.
 Leeds United A.F.C.
 Manchester United F.C.
 Grand National

Celebrities
 Kenneth Horne
 Gene Kelly
 Dirk Bogarde
 Bob Danvers-Walker
 Michael O'Hehir
 Peter O'Sullevan
 Bebe Daniels
 Ben Lyon
 Gregory Peck
 Greta Kukkonen
 Valerie Hobson
 John McCallum
 Margaret Lockwood
 Peter Sellers
 Lord Mayor of Birkenhead, Alderman Griffith Davies
 Petula Clark
 Lisa Daniely
 Christine Norden
 Richard Todd
 Jack Hawkins
 Paul Carpenter

Scholars
 Carl Jung
 Friedrich Engels

Radio programmes
 Julian and Sandy

Laws
 Sexual Offences Act 1956

Religious leaders
 John, Cardinal Heenan
 Pope Pius XII
 Pope John XXIII

Historical figures
 William III of England

Contemporary
 Hovis bread
 Bakelite radio

Reception
The film was almost universally acclaimed, with praise mostly focusing on its warmth and heartfelt approach. It holds a 95% 'certified fresh' critical score on Rotten Tomatoes based on 56 reviews. On Metacritic, it holds an 81% critical score based on 9 reviews, indicating universal acclaim.

It has been described as "a mesmerizing and eloquent essay" by Jonathan Rosenbaum of Chicago Reader, "a warm and extremely thoughtful journey, with a deliberately bare-bones narrative" by Peter Hartlaub of the San Francisco Chronicle, "a distinct pleasure to experience" by Kenneth Turan of the Los Angeles Times, "mesmerizing, visceral and heartfelt" by Geoff Pevere of the Toronto Star, "a short, beautiful, characteristically sublime memory piece" by Lisa Schwarzbaum of Entertainment Weekly, "a wistful, funny, satirical, angry and forgiving portrait" by Sean Axmaker of Parallax View, and "a visual poem" by Dennis Schwartz of Ozus' World Movie Reviews. In 2018, Mark Kermode chose it as his favourite film of the last ten years.

People’s Stories - Liverpool’s social history website
In 2010 - 'in response' to the film - the website People’s Stories: Liverpool Lives was launched. With Heritage Lottery funding, the website was created for Of Time and the City producer Sol Papadopoulos by transmedia creator Krishna Stott. Stott described the project as 'a community-based site of user generated content for Liverpudlians and the scouse diaspora'. Actors Jonathan Pryce, Alexei Sayle, and Joe McGann contributed their own memories of the city as part of the launch. The site was a place for members of the public to upload and share their stories, films, or photographs. Papadopoulos commented: 'We had Liverpudlians from all over the world wanting to tell their story, inspired by the way Terence had told his'.

See also
The Memories of Angels, a similarly constructed film about Montreal

References

External links
 Official website
 
 Full transcript at Oftimeandthecity.com

2008 films
Films set in Liverpool
Films directed by Terence Davies
British documentary films
Documentary films about cities
Autobiographical documentary films
2008 documentary films
British anthology films
Collage film
Documentary films about England
2000s English-language films
2000s British films